Cliff Johnson (born 1953) is an American game designer, best known for the puzzle video games The Fool's Errand (1987) and 3 in Three (1990). Both games use visual puzzles and a metapuzzle structure. Both won GAMES Magazines Best Puzzle Game of the Year.

Biography 
Johnson was born August 14, 1953 in Hanover, New Hampshire, the only child of Norman and Leatrice Johnson. He attended Bristol Eastern High School in Connecticut, where he started making Super 8 movies. In 1972, he had jobs "building monsters" for five different amusement parks. He later attended University of Southern California's film school, where he became a teaching assistant in animation and created some of the Monty Pythonesque animations for Nickelodeon's television series Out of Control.

In 1984, using his first computer, a Macintosh 512K, he learned to program and created the game The Fool's Errand, which in 1987 won "Best Puzzle Game of the Year" from GAMES Magazine and was declared "Best Retro Game Ever" by British GamesTM magazine.)

From 1990–1995, he directed the *FunHouse* production group for Philips Media, and from 1996–2001, he consulted with Mattel, Warner Bros. and Disney for online puzzles and treasure hunts.

In 2002, Johnson designed a $100,000 Challenge for the book Mysterious Stranger by street magician David Blaine. It was solved in 2004.

Authored games
The Fool's Errand (1987) — GAMES Magazine'''s Best Puzzle Game of the YearAt the Carnival (1989) — Macworld Game Hall of Fame inductee, Brain Teaser categoryDisney's Cartoon Arcade (1990)3 in Three (1990) — MacUser's Best Game of the Year; GAMES Magazine's Best Puzzle Game of the YearHanna Barbera's Cartoon Carnival (1993)Merlin's Apprentice (1994)Labyrinth of Crete (1995)The Fool and His Money (2012)

 Other contributed works 
 Game Design: Disney's The Hunt for the Lost Toy, website contest, 1996
 Game Design: Of Light and Darkness: The Prophecy, 1998
 Treasure Hunt Design: David Blaine's Mysterious Stranger book, 2002

 References 

External links

Johnson's official website (click on the image at the upper right to see his biography timeline)Inside Mac Games'', March 31, 2003, "Cliff Johnson's April Fool's Treasure Hunt"

1953 births
Living people
American video game designers
Puzzle designers
USC School of Cinematic Arts alumni
People from Hanover, New Hampshire
People from Bristol, Connecticut